Verband deutscher Gewerkschaften ('League of German Trade Unions') was a German Nazi trade union centre in Czechoslovakia. The organization was formed in 1929, by eight unions that broke away from the Reichsvereinigung der deutscher Gewerkschaften. At the time of the founding of Verband deutscher Gewerkschaften, its affiliates claimed a combined membership of 46,700. The organization had its headquarters in Ústí nad Labem.

Affiliated unions

Leadership
The key leaders of the organization were Friedrich Ritter, Eduard Tischler, Greta Hummelová and Eduard Wenzel (treasurer).

Growth and fall
At its peak, the organization claimed to have around 120,000 members. However, in November 1933 the German National Socialist Workers Party (DNSAP) and the three most important affiliates of the Verband deutscher Gewerkschaften (Gewerkschaftsverband deutscher Arbeiter, Gewerkschaft deutscher Eisenbahner and Deutschsozialistische Bergarbeiterverband) were banned. Verband deutscher Gewerkschaften collapsed soon thereafter.

References

1929 establishments in Czechoslovakia
National trade union centers of Czechoslovakia
Fascist trade unions